Medina of Taza is the oldest town or quarter in the city of Taza, Morocco. It is classified as a national cultural heritage.

History 
The quarter was first known as 'Ribāt Taza رباط تازة'  which was a Fatimid military camp. It was first settled by Miknasa tribesmen before the Almoravid empire took over in 1074. They were replaced by the Almohad empire in 1132. In 1248 the city was captured by the Marinids. In 1914, it fell to the French.

Notable monuments 
The medina has several notable historical monuments:

 Great Mosque of Taza
 Al-Andalous Mosque
 Borj Taza
 14th-century madrasa (Coranic school)
 City gates, also called bab
 Bab Jemaa, or Friday Gate
 Bab el-Qebbour
 Bab el-Rih, or the Wind Gate

Gallery

References 

Medinas of Morocco
Taza